James Cole (born August 13, 1951) is a Canadian former professional ice hockey player.

Sports career 
During the 1976–77 season, Cole played two games in the World Hockey Association (WHA) with the Winnipeg Jets.

References

External links

1951 births
Living people
Canadian ice hockey left wingers
Winnipeg Jets (WHA) players